Keith M. Moody (born June 13, 1953) is a former American football defensive back in the National Football League (NFL). He was drafted by the Buffalo Bills in the 10th round of the 1976 NFL Draft. He played college football at Syracuse.

Moody also played for the Oakland Raiders and earned a Super Bowl ring with them in Super Bowl XV. He finished his career in 1983 with the USFL's New Jersey Generals. He is also a member of the Syracuse Sports Hall of Fame.

Recently Moody has been working at the MVLA High School District, where he is now an executive.

In 2013, Moody left his principal position at Mountain View High School to teach adult education and he retired in 2017.

Head coaching record

References

1953 births
Living people
American football cornerbacks
American football safeties
American football return specialists
Brockport Golden Eagles football coaches
Buffalo Bills players
New Jersey Generals players
Oakland Raiders players
Syracuse Orange football players
People from Salisbury, North Carolina
Players of American football from Syracuse, New York